Golf was one of the many sports which was held at the 2002 Asian Games in Asiad Country Club, Busan, South Korea between 3 and 6 October 2002.

The event was open to amateur players only. Golf had team and individual events for men and women.

Medalists

Medal table

Participating nations
A total of 82 athletes from 17 nations competed in golf at the 2002 Asian Games:

References

2002 Asian Games Report, Pages 420–425

External links
Official website

 
2002 Asian Games events
2002
Asian Games
2002 Asian Games